Grodnica  is a village in the administrative district of Gmina Olszyna, within Lubań County, Lower Silesian Voivodeship, in southwestern Poland.

References

Grodnica